Undefinable is the debut album of Huang Yida, released in 2004.

Track list
1. 地下铁 (Subway)
2. 蓝天 (Blue Day)
3. 显微镜下的爱情 (Love Under the Microscope)
4. 线上游戏 (Online Game)
5. 匿名的宝贝 (My Anonymous Babe)
6. 喜欢你 (喜欢我) [Love You (Love Me)]
7. 一滴未干的泪 (A Teardrop Yet to Dry)
8. 简单
9. 变质的感情 (A Love Turned Sour)
10. GO AWAY
11. 等边三角 (Equilateral Triangle)

2004 debut albums